Robert Rosenberg may refer to:
 Robert Rosenberg (writer) (1951–2006), writer, journalist, poet and Internet pioneer
 Robert M. Rosenberg (born 1938), American businessman, chief executive officer of Dunkin' Donuts 
 Robert A. Rosenberg (born 1934), United States Air Force general